George Leslie MacDonald (5 October 1906 – 25 September 1997), known as Les or Shorty MacDonald, competed for Canada in rowing events in the 1932 and 1936 Olympics, winning a bronze medal as coxswain in the men's eight event in the 1932 games in Los Angeles. He also won a bronze medal in the same event at the 1930 British Empire Games.

MacDonald was born in Hamilton, Ontario. His adult height of  brought him the nickname "Shorty", but he commenced his sporting career in basketball before joining Hamilton's Leander Rowing Club. Prior to his rowing career MacDonald worked for Dominion Power, now Ontario Hydro. At the age of 19 he received a commendation from the Governor General of Canada for rescuing and reviving a young boy who had fallen into the waters of Burlington Bay.

There was controversy over the result of the men's eight in the 1936 Olympics. Prior to the race the team was out practising when a spectator boat came too close to the rowing shell, and one of its occupants was hit and injured by an oar. The Canadian team's equipment was confiscated and they were forced to compete using old German equipment, and instructed by German officials not to leave the country until a full inquiry had taken place. The team finished fourth and left Germany immediately with the assistance of Olympic officials, who had concerns about the outcome of the proposed enquiry.

MacDonald served in the armed forces during World War II, and spent some time in London where he worked in bomb disposal. After the war he was decorated for his role.

He worked for Ontario Hydro until his retirement at age 65. In the mid 1960s he served as Head Coach of Leander Rowing Club. He died during a visit to Scotland in 1997, aged 90.

References

External links
Leander Boat Club – an incomplete history

1906 births
1997 deaths
Rowers from Hamilton, Ontario
Rowers at the 1932 Summer Olympics
Rowers at the 1936 Summer Olympics
Olympic bronze medalists for Canada
Canadian male rowers
Olympic rowers of Canada
Rowers at the 1930 British Empire Games
Commonwealth Games bronze medallists for Canada
Olympic medalists in rowing
Medalists at the 1932 Summer Olympics
Commonwealth Games medallists in rowing
Coxswains (rowing)
Medallists at the 1930 British Empire Games